NA-1 Upper Chitral-cum-Lower Chitral is a constituency for the National Assembly of Pakistan. It comprises the whole districts of Upper and Lower Chitral. It was formerly known as NW-15 Chitral from 1970 to 1977 NA-24 Chitral from 1977 to 1997. In 2002, it was changed to NA-32 (Chitral). The delimitation in 2018 saw the constituency name be changed to NA-1 (Chitral).

Members of Parliament

1977–2002: NA-32 (Chitral)

2002–2018: NA-32 (Chitral)

Since 2018: NA-1 (Chitral)

Election 2002

General Elections were held on 10 October 2002. Abdul Akbar Khan won this seat with 36,130 votes.

Election 2008

General Elections were held on 18 February 2008. Shahzada Mohiuddin won this seat with 33,278 votes.

Election 2013

General Elections were held on 11 May 2013. Shahzada Iftikhar Uddin won this seat with 29,772 votes.

Election 2018 

General elections were held on 25 July 2018.

Contest overview
Shahzada Iftikhar Uddin previously ran twice from this constituency, first in 2002 on Pakistan Muslim League (Q) ticket and then in 2013 on All Pakistan Muslim League ticket. He was runner up in 2002 and winner in 2013. He ran on Pakistan Muslim League (N) ticket in 2018 and lost. Former dictator and president of Pakistan, Pervez Musharraf initially expressed intention to run from this constituency being head of All Pakistan Muslim League but he resigned as APML head thus Mohammad Amjad, his replacement ran from this constituency from APML. Saleem Khan of Pakistan Peoples Party Parliamentarians had been a member of Khyber Pakhtunkhwa Assembly from 2008 to 2018 but he ran for National Assembly from this constituency in 2018.

Results

†JI and JUI-F contested as part of MMA

See also
NA-266 Killa Abdullah-cum-Chaman
NA-2 Swat-I

References

External links 
Election result's official website

1
1